Laurence Kiely (22 October 1880 – 12 December 1961) was an Irish hurdler. He competed in the men's 110 metres hurdles at the 1908 Summer Olympics.

References

1880 births
1961 deaths
Athletes (track and field) at the 1908 Summer Olympics
Irish male hurdlers
Olympic athletes of Great Britain
Place of birth missing